The 2021–22 Basketligaen is the 47th season of the highest professional basketball tier in Denmark. The season started on 22 September 2021 and ended 19 May 2022.

Teams

Statistics 

Statistics after the regular season.

References

External links
Official Basketligaen website

Basketligaen seasons
Danish
Basketball
Basketball